Åke Jonsson (born 5 October 1942) is a Swedish former professional motocross racer. He was one of the top riders in the Motocross World Championships during the late 1960s and early 1970s. Jonsson came close to winning the world championship title in 1968, 1970 and in 1971 when he led the championship going into the final round when, a mechanical failure ruined his bid.

Motocross racing career
Born in Hammerdal, Jonsson's family moved to Västerås when he was a child. He became a skilled speed skater and belonged to the Swedish top junior elite before his motorcycle racing career took precedence. His physical conditioning from ice skating helped him achieve early success when he transitioned to motorcycle racing. 

At the age of 16, he acquired his first motorcycle when he purchased a DKW. He began competing in motocross races and progressed to the Swedish motocross national championship in 1963. Unable to afford a new motorcycle, Jonsson decided to build his own motorcycle from spare parts and, rode it to a ninth place in the 250cc Swedish national championship. 

His impressive results earned him a sponsorship to ride for the Husqvarna factory and with a new motorcycle, Jonsson was able to defeat Torsten Hallman for the 1964 250cc Swedish national championship. In 1964, Jonsson began competing in the 250cc Motocross World Championships and posted impressive results with a third place at his home Swedish Grand Prix and finishing second to defending world champion Joel Robert at the Finnish Grand Prix. In 1966, Jonsson won his first Grand Prix race with a victory at the 1966 250cc Luxembourg Grand Prix at Schifflange. 

Jonsson completed his engineering degree in 1967, but delayed entering the engineering profession and continued to compete in motocross. He moved up to the 500cc class in 1968 and won the national championship over Christer Hammargren and Bengt Åberg. Although Jonsson was posting impressive results, Husqvarna's meager racing budget meant that world champions Bengt Aberg and Torsten Hallman received most of their support, leaving Jonsson struggling to secure spare parts for his motorcycle. Nevertheless, he finished in third place in the 1968 500cc World Championship and claimed his first 500cc world championship race at home by winning the Swedish Grand Prix at Motala. 

In 1969 he was hired to ride for the Maico factory racing team alongside teammates Adolf Weil and Willy Bauer. He rode a Maico to finish once again in third place in the 1970 500cc World Championship. Later that season he won the Inter-AM series in America. The 1971 season would be Jonsson's best year. Going into the final race of the 500cc world championship, Jonsson held a slight points lead over Suzuki's Roger De Coster. While leading the race, his motorcycle's spark plug came loose, allowing DeCoster to pass him for the victory and the World Championship. A few weeks later he took a slight revenge by winning both motos in the Motocross des Nations held in Vannes, France.

Jonsson was injured in the middle of the 1972 Grand Prix season but, almost finished the season as the series runner up. At the last race for the season in Ettelbruck, Luxembourg, Jonsson won the first moto and, was leading the second moto on the last lap when his bike ran out of fuel, causing a DNF. Instead of being the runner up, he now took a fourth place in the 1972 world championship. Jonsson then dominated the season ending 1972 Trans-AMA motocross series held in America, winning nine consecutive races at one point.

For the 1973 season, Jonsson was hired for three years, by the Yamaha to ride their new motorcycle with its innovative rear suspension using a single shock absorber called a monoshock. When he first joined the Yamaha team, it was rumored that he installed Maico front suspension to his bike but, Jonsson stated in a later interview that the forks were manufactured in Japan. He had a series of mechanical difficulties and a lot of development in the motorcycle and failed to repeat his performance of the previous years. In 1976, he returned to ride for the Maico team but, broke his collarbone and finished in eighth place in the world championship.

Jonsson retired from competition after the 1978 Swedish national championship season. Jonsson was also a member of three victorious Swedish Motocross des Nations teams in 1970, 1971 and 1974, and three Trophees des Nations wins, 1964, 1966 and 1967. Jonsson has won the Swedish National Championship seven times. After his racing career he ran a Yamaha dealership in Sweden. Today he lives a retired life in Sweden.

He was also a co-author of "The Technique of Moto-Cross," with Vin Gilligan, a book on advanced riding techniques for racers. Former Dutch world championship motocross competitor, Gerrit Wolsink, in an interview with "Motocross Action" magazine, praised the book strongly, saying that even at his level, he learned helpful information about techniques to use in various situations.

Motocross results

 1963 8th in the Swedish Champion (250cc)
 1964 Swedish Champion (250cc) - 6th in the World Champion (250cc) - Trophees des Nations Champion
 1965 4th in the Swedish Champion (250cc) - 5th in the World Champion (250cc)
 1966 4th in the Swedish Champion (250cc) - 5th in the World Champion (250cc) - Trophees des Nations Champion - 3rd Motocross des Nations
 1967 Swedish Champion (500cc) - 18th in the World Champion (500cc) - Trophees des Nations Champion - 2nd Motocross des Nations
 1968 Swedish Champion (500cc) - 3rd in the World Champion (500cc)
 1969 4th in the Swedish Champion (500cc) - 13th in the World Champion (500cc) - 2nd Motocross des Nations - 3rd in the Inter-AM series
 1970 3rd in the Swedish Champion (500cc) - 3rd in the World Champion (500cc) - Motocross des Nations Champion - Inter-AM Champion
 1971 2nd in the Swedish Champion (500cc) - 2nd in the World Champion (500cc) - Motocross des Nations Champion
 1972 Swedish Champion (500cc) - 4th in the World Champion (500cc) - 2nd Motocross des Nations - Trans-AMA Champion
 1973 Swedish Champion (500cc) - 4th in the World Champion (500cc) - 2nd Motocross des Nations
 1974 2nd in the Swedish Champion (500cc) - 7th in the World Champion (500cc) - Motocross des Nations Champion
 1975 Swedish Champion (500cc) - 4th in the World Champion (500cc)
 1976 Swedish Champion (500cc) - 8th in the World Champion (500cc) - 4th Trophees des Nations
 1977 3rd in the Swedish Champion (500cc) - 23rd in the World Champion (500cc)
 1978 6th in the Swedish Champion (500cc) - 25th in the World Champion (500cc)

References

External links
 Ake Jonsson official website
 Ake Jonsson's 1972 Maico motorcycle

Living people
1942 births
Sportspeople from Västerås
People from Strömsund Municipality
Swedish motocross riders